The 2014 FIFA World Cup qualification UEFA Group G was a UEFA qualifying group for the 2014 FIFA World Cup. The group comprised Greece, Slovakia, Bosnia and Herzegovina, Lithuania, Latvia and Liechtenstein.

Bosnia and Herzegovina won the group on the ratio of head from Greece and thus qualified directly for the 2014 FIFA World Cup, their first major tournament as an independent country. Greece, as one of the eight best runners-up, advanced to the play-offs, where they were drawn to play home-and-away matches against Romania. They won the first match and drew the second, thus also qualifying for the World Cup.

Standings

Matches
The match schedule was determined at a meeting in Bratislava, Slovakia, on 18 November 2011.

Goalscorers
There were 76 goals scored in 30 matches for an average of 2.53 goals per match.

10 goals

 Edin Džeko

8 goals

 Vedad Ibišević

5 goals

 Zvjezdan Misimović

3 goals

 Miralem Pjanić
 Dimitris Salpingidis
 Martin Jakubko
 Marek Sapara

2 goals

 Theofanis Gekas
 Konstantinos Mitroglou
 Aleksandrs Cauņa
 Edgaras Česnauskis
 Deivydas Matulevičius
 Marek Hamšík

1 goal

 Ermin Bičakčić
 Izet Hajrović
 Senad Lulić
 Haris Medunjanin
 Lazaros Christodoulopoulos
 Giorgos Karagounis
 Sotiris Ninis
 Nikos Spyropoulos
 Nauris Bulvītis
 Edgars Gauračs
 Kaspars Gorkšs
 Vladimirs Kamešs
 Renārs Rode
 Valērijs Šabala
 Māris Verpakovskis
 Artūrs Zjuzins
 Martin Büchel
 Mathias Christen
 Nicolas Hasler
 Michele Polverino
 Fedor Černych
 Tadas Kijanskas
 Saulius Mikoliūnas
 Darvydas Šernas
 Marius Žaliūkas
 Ján Ďurica
 Viktor Pečovský
 Kornel Saláta

1 own goal

 Martin Škrtel (playing against Greece)

Discipline

References

External links
Results and schedule for UEFA Group G (FIFA.com version)
Results and schedule for UEFA Group G (UEFA.com version)

G
2012–13 in Bosnia and Herzegovina football
Qual
2012–13 in Greek football
Qual
2012–13 in Liechtenstein football
2013–14 in Liechtenstein football
2012 in Lithuanian football
2014 in Lithuanian football
2012 in Latvian football
2013 in Latvian football